Super Mario is a video game series by Nintendo.

Super Mario may also refer to:

Video games 
Super Mario Bros., the first game of the video game series released in 1985 for the NES platform
Mario (franchise), the franchise to which the Super Mario series belongs
Mario, the star character of Nintendo's Mario series

Television 
List of Mario television series, a list of television series based on the Mario series of video games

Literature 
Super Mario-kun, a 1991 Mario Manga comic series written by Yukio Sawada
Super Mario Adventures, a 1992 anthology of Manga comics written by Charlie Nozawa

People 
Since the appearance of Super Mario Bros., a number of individuals named Mario have been nicknamed "Super Mario" by fans or by the media.

Mario Andretti (born 1940), American racing driver
Mario Balotelli (born 1990), Italian footballer
Mario Basler (born 1968), German footballer
Mario Cipollini (born 1967), Italian cyclist
Mario Corti (manager) (born 1946), Swiss businessman
Mario Draghi (born 1947), Italian banker and public servant
Mario Dumont (born 1970), Canadian politician
Mario Elie (born 1963), American basketball player
Mario Götze (born 1992), German footballer
Mario Gómez (born 1985), German footballer who also plays for Bayern Munich
Mário Jardel (born 1973), Brazilian football player
Mario Lemieux (born 1965), former Canadian ice hockey player
Mario Mandžukić (born 1986), Croatian footballer who also plays for Juventus
Mario Matt (born 1979), Austrian alpine skier
Mario Monti (born 1943), Italian economist and politician
Mario Reiter (born 1970), Austrian alpine skier
Mario Salcedo (born 1949 or 1950), a long-term passenger on Royal Caribbean International-branded cruise ships
Mario Vrančić (born 1989), Bosnian-Herzegovinian footballer
Mario Williams (born 1985), American football player

See also 
Mario (disambiguation)
Super Mario Bros. (disambiguation)
Super Mario World (disambiguation)
Mariusz Pudzianowski (born 1977), strongman and mixed martial artist nicknamed "Super Mariusz" in reference to the video game character Mario
Supermarionation, a puppetry technique devised in the 1960s by British production company AP Films